Weather report may refer to:
 Weather forecasting, the application of science and technology to predict the weather
 Weather Report, an American jazz fusion musical group and two namesake studio albums:
 Weather Report (1971 album)
 Weather Report (1982 album) 
 Weather Report, a 2003 album by Chris Watson
 "Weather Report", a song by Scandal from the 2013 album Standard
 "Weather Report", a speaking recording by Raffi from his 1995 album Raffi Radio
 Weather Report, a fictional character from JoJo's Bizarre Adventure: Stone Ocean